"Lost on You" is a song by Scottish singer-songwriter Lewis Capaldi. It was released as a digital download on 7 July 2017 via Virgin Records as the second single from his debut extended play Bloom and his debut studio album Divinely Uninspired to a Hellish Extent. The song peaked at number 50 on the Scottish Singles Chart.

Charts

Certifications

Release history

References

2017 songs
2017 singles
Lewis Capaldi songs
Songs written by David Sneddon
Virgin Records singles